Deewana Mujh Sa Nahin (English: No One's As Crazy As Me) is a 1990 Indian romantic drama film directed by Y. Nageshwar Rao and starring Aamir Khan, Madhuri Dixit and Jainendra.

Plot
Ajay Sharma (Aamir Khan) is a photographer, Anita (Madhuri Dixit) is a model, and both of them work for the same agency. Ajay has fallen in love with Anita, and thinks that she is also in love with him. But Anita only takes him for a friend. She gets engaged to Vikram (Jainendra), and the marriage is to take place soon. Ajay still believes that Anita loves him, and he also starts making preparations for his marriage with Anita. Anita must now take appropriate steps to stop Ajay's obsession with her, before the matter gets out of hand. However, Anita realizes the person whom she is marrying does not love her and the situation turns such that she realizes Ajay's love for her and the film ends on happy note.

Cast
 Aamir Khan as Ajay Sharma
 Madhuri Dixit as Anita
 Jainendra as Vikram
 Khushbu as Sonu
 Satyendra Kapoor as Nandkishore Sharma
Beena Banerjee as Mrs. Sharma
 Dinesh Hingoo as Bholaram Bokade 
Narendra Nath as Anita's uncle
 Deven Verma as Mamaji, Ajay's uncle
 Yunus Parvez as Police Inspector 
 Babbanlal Yadav as Sharma
 Ranjeeta Kaur as Anita's sister

Soundtrack
The music for Deewana Mujh Sa Nahin was composed by Anand–Milind with lyrics by Sameer.

References

External links

1990 films
1990s Hindi-language films
Films scored by Anand–Milind